Juraj Dančík (born 21 February 1982) is a Slovak former football player.

External links
 
 

1982 births
Living people
Slovak footballers
Association football defenders
MŠK Žilina players
FK Senica players
Podbeskidzie Bielsko-Biała players
Ekstraklasa players
I liga players
II liga players
III liga players
Slovak expatriate footballers
Expatriate footballers in Poland
Slovak expatriate sportspeople in Poland